Sir Alan Shallcross Hulme KBE (14 February 19079 October 1989) was an Australian politician, accountant and cattle breeder. He was born in the Sydney suburb of Mosman and was educated at North Sydney Boys High School. He moved to Queensland before World War II, where he practised as an accountant.  He was a founding member of the Queensland People's Party and was its president in 1949, when it merged with the Liberal Party.

Hulme won the House of Representatives seat of Petrie at its creation at the 1949 election for the Liberal Party.  He was Minister for Supply from 1958 to his defeat in the 1961 election by Reginald O'Brien.  He won Petrie back at the 1963 election and became Postmaster-General until his retirement at the 1972 election.  He was also Vice-President of the Executive Council from 1966 to 1972.  As Postmaster-General, he was responsible for the introduction of an Australian-owned satellite system in 1970, Aussat, which was later privatised as Optus. In 1972 he was involved in the decision to impose health warnings on cigarette advertising.  He was also responsible for the controversial decision to build Black Mountain Tower in Canberra. In 1972 he announced that colour television would be introduced in Australia from 1 March 1975, by which time he had retired from politics and his party was out of office.

Hulme was made a Knight Commander of the Order of the British Empire in January 1971. He died in 1989, survived by two sons and a daughter.

Notes

1907 births
1989 deaths
Members of the Australian House of Representatives for Petrie
Members of the Australian House of Representatives
Members of the Cabinet of Australia
Australian Knights Commander of the Order of the British Empire
Australian politicians awarded knighthoods
Liberal Party of Australia members of the Parliament of Australia
Queensland People's Party politicians
Politicians from Sydney
Australian accountants
20th-century Australian politicians
People educated at North Sydney Boys High School